The Adua-class submarine was the fourth sub-class of the 600 Series of coastal submarines built for the  (Royal Italian Navy) during the 1930s. There were 17 submarines in this class, almost all named after places in Ethiopia which had been an Italian colony since 1936, but only one, survived World War II. Three submarines of this class (Gondar, Ascianghi, and Neghelli) were sold to Brazil before the war and replaced with submarines of the same names.

Design and description
The Adua-class submarines were essentially repeats of the preceding  design. They displaced  surfaced and  submerged.

For surface running, the boats were powered by two  diesel engines, each driving one propeller shaft. When submerged each propeller was driven by a  electric motor. They could reach  on the surface and  underwater.

The boats were armed with six internal  torpedo tubes, four in the bow and two in the stern. One reload torpedo was carried for each tube, for a total of twelve. They were also armed with one  deck gun for combat on the surface. The light anti-aircraft armament consisted of one or two pairs of   machine guns.

Ships

Service

The boats, once commissioned, were assigned to complete the squadrons of "600" submarines strengthening the 11th and 14th Squadrons at  La Spezia and 43rd at Taranto. After initial training, many of these boats carried out training cruises in the Dodecanese and along the coast of North Africa.

During the Spanish Civil War (1937–1938) five of the submarines already in service made seven special missions on behalf the Franco's regime without much success.

During 1938–39 the boats largely changed their assignment locations: there was at first a single squadron on four submarines at La Spezia four other submarines formed the 23rd Squadron at Naples, and five more were assigned to Leros. In 1939 there was not a single boat of the series at La Spezia, while the squadron at Leros was strengthened. In 1939 four boats from Naples and Taranto bases were sent to Tobruk.

At the outbreak of the World War II, there were four submarines assigned to each of the bases of La Spezia, Cagliari, Messina and Taranto, and one submarine,  was located at the Red Sea base of Massawa.

See also
 Italian submarines of World War II

Notes

References

External links 
 Italian Submarines Class "600"

  

Italian 600 Series submarines
 
Submarine classes
Ships built by Cantieri navali Tosi di Taranto
Ships built by Cantieri Riuniti dell'Adriatico
Ships built by OTO Melara